Glencoe is a census-designated place (CDP) in Volusia County, Florida, United States. The population was 2,582 at the 2010 census.

Geography
Glencoe is located at  (29.009764, -80.965759).

Demographics

As of the census of 2000, there were 2,485 people, 975 households, and 740 families residing in the CDP.  The population density was 125.4/km2 (325.0/mi2).  There were 1,033 housing units at an average density of 52.1/km2 (135.1/mi2).  The racial makeup of the CDP was 97.99% White, 1.09% African American, 0.16% Native American, 0.12% Asian, 0.04% Pacific Islander, and 0.60% from two or more races. Hispanic or Latino of any race were 0.97% of the population.

There were 975 households, out of which 31.3% had children under the age of 18 living with them, 61.5% were married couples living together, 10.2% had a female householder with no husband present, and 24.1% were non-families. 18.9% of all households were made up of individuals, and 8.8% had someone living alone who was 65 years of age or older.  The average household size was 2.54 and the average family size was 2.86.

In the CDP, the population was spread out, with 23.0% under the age of 18, 6.3% from 18 to 24, 26.9% from 25 to 44, 27.2% from 45 to 64, and 16.7% who were 65 years of age or older.  The median age was 42 years. For every 100 females, there were 99.9 males.  For every 100 females age 18 and over, there were 95.4 males.

The median income for a household in the CDP was $36,915, and the median income for a family was $45,958. Males had a median income of $36,383 versus $23,793 for females. The per capita income for the CDP was $21,816.  About 4.6% of families and 5.6% of the population were below the poverty line, including 2.5% of those under age 18 and 4.3% of those age 65 or over.

References

Census-designated places in Volusia County, Florida
Census-designated places in Florida